American Athletic Conference Championship or American Athletic Conference Tournament may refer to:

American Athletic Conference men's basketball tournament, men's basketball championship
American Athletic Conference women's basketball tournament, women's basketball championship
American Athletic Conference baseball tournament, baseball championship
American Athletic Conference Football Championship Game, college football championship